Mississippi's 2nd congressional district (MS-2) covers much of Western Mississippi. It includes most of Jackson, the riverfront cities of Greenville and Vicksburg and the interior market cities of Clarksdale, Greenwood and Clinton. It is the only majority-black district in the state.

The district is home to four of Mississippi's eight public four-year colleges and universities: Alcorn State University in Lorman; Delta State University in Cleveland; Jackson State University in Jackson; and Mississippi Valley State University in Itta Bena, a few miles west of Greenwood. All except Delta State are HBCUs and are members of the Southwestern Athletic Conference.

From statehood to the election of 1846, Mississippi elected representatives at-large statewide on a general ticket. This favored candidates who could command a majority of the voters, then consisting mostly of white men of property.

Following Reconstruction, the Democratic Party regained control of the state legislature and worked to reduce Republican voting strength in the state. It redefined congressional districts, creating a 'shoestring' congressional district running the length of the Mississippi River and taking in the majority-black (then Republican) areas of the Mississippi Delta. By this gerrymandering, they created five other districts with white majorities.

Election campaigns were often accompanied by fraud and violence as Democrats tried to reduce black Republican voting. Finally, the Democratic-dominated legislature passed a new constitution in 1890, with barriers to voter registration and other measures that effectively disenfranchised most blacks and many poor whites for decades, subduing the Republican and Populist movements of the late 19th century.

The legislature has redefined congressional districts over the years to reflect population changes in the state. Districts 5 through 8 were reallocated to the 1st, 3rd and 4th. The 2nd, bounded by the Mississippi River on the west, continues to have a black-majority population. Since the passage of the Civil Rights Act of 1964 and Voting Rights Act of 1965, which provided federal oversight and enforcement to protect voting rights, African American residents here have consistently supported Democratic Party candidates. On the other hand, most white conservatives have shifted into the Republican Party, which would eventually dominate the state legislature. The district is one of the poorest in the U.S., with 26.2% of people in poverty as of 2017.

The district's current Representative is Democrat Bennie Thompson.

Election results from presidential races

Recent election results

2000

2002

2004

2006

2008

2010

2012

2014

2016

2018

2020

2022

List of members representing the district

Historical district boundaries

See also

Mississippi's congressional districts
List of United States congressional districts

References

 Congressional Biographical Directory of the United States 1774–present

02